Sky Petroleum v VIP Petroleum [1974] 1 WLR 576 is an English contract law case, concerning the possibility of claiming specific performance of a promise after breach of contract.

Facts
VIP Petroleum had agreed to sell Sky Petroleum all their petrol and diesel needs at fixed prices and in a minimum annual quantity. With the 1973 oil crisis leading to severe shortages, Sky had no prospect of finding an alternative supply. But VIP terminated the contract on the ground Sky had exceeded the credit provisions in the contract. Sky sought an injunction for VIP to sell the petrol, rather than just pay damages, so that it could stay in business.

Judgment
Goulding J held that while the general rule is that courts grant only damages for breach of contract to supply non-specific goods, the unusual state of the market made specific performance of supplying petrol the appropriate remedy. Damages were not adequate.

See also

English contract law

English contract case law
1974 in case law
1974 in British law
High Court of Justice cases